Carea varipes is a moth of the family Nolidae first described by Francis Walker in 1856. It is found in Oriental region to Sundaland.

Description
Its forewings have an axe-head shape. The caterpillar has a distinctive swollen thoracic tumidity. Tumidity is glossy green. A mottled white band runs from the thorax to the conical horn. Its horn is broad and pale green. A small white patch can be found between horn and anal claspers. Its head is red. The caterpillars live singly and are not gregarious. Larval host plants are Eugenia and Rhodomyrtus tomentosa, Campomanesia, Cleistocalyx and Syzygium cumini.

Subspecies
Two subspecies recognized.Carea varipes leucobathra Prout, 1922Carea varipes roseotincta'' Roepke, 1938

Gallery

References

External links
Media in category "Carea varipes"
Development rate, consumption, and host specificity of Carea varipes

Moths of Asia
Moths described in 1856
Nolidae